Union St. Florian are an Austrian association football club founded in 1947 playing in the 4th tier OÖ Liga during 2020/21 season.
They finished 10th the previous season.

Current squad

Staff and board members
 Manager: Herbert Panholzer
 Assistant Manager:  Gerhard Obermüller
 Goalkeeper coach:  Thomas Mayrbäul
 President:  Hans Höfler
 Vice President:  Hans Höfler & Walter Meinhart

External links
 http://www.stfl1.at/  Official Website

Association football clubs established in 1947
Football clubs in Austria
1947 establishments in Austria